Power of the Primes is the third and final installment of the Transformers: Prime Wars Trilogy, a toyline and transmedia series created by Hasbro as part of the Transformers franchise. It consists of the toy line, as well as the animated web series of the same name.

Development of the franchise began in November 2016 with the announcement of an animated web series by Machinima, based on the upcoming toyline. In January 2017, Hasbro held a fan-vote to decide which character would become the next Prime in the franchise. In February, it was decided that Optimus Primal would become the next Prime.

Development
Power of the Primes was first announced on November 29, 2016. Hasbro announced that it would once again partner with Machinima—after having previously worked with them on the animated web series adaptation of Transformers: Combiner Wars—to produce the adaptations for Transformers: Titans Return and Transformers: Power of the Primes. Eric Calderon, showrunner of Combiner Wars, was confirmed to have returned for both Titans Return and Power of the Primes.

In January 2017, Hasbro created a poll allowing fans to vote which Transformer will become the next Prime. The vote occurred in two stages. During the first, fans voted for the leaders of three different personality factions; honor, order and chaos. Honor was represented by Arcee, Ultra Magnus and Hound; Order by Megatron, Star Saber and Shockwave and Chaos by Thunderwing, Optimus Primal and an Unknown Evil (Deathsaurus). The winners of the first round were Ultra Magnus, Star Saber and Optimus Primal, advancing into the second round alongside the Unknown Evil as a wildcard. The poll ended a month later on February 18, and Optimus Primal was chosen as the next Prime.

At the 2017 San Diego Comic-Con on July 20, Hasbro revealed during their panel some of the figures of the toyline. The figures shown were those of Liege Maximo, Dreadwind, Blackwing, Starscream, Jazz and Rodimus Prime. During Hasbro's first HasCon fan convention in September, the new Combiner Volcanicus was revealed. The combiner is composed of the five Dinobots: Grimlock, Slug, Sludge, Snarl and Swoop.

Controversy
In November 2017, a fan noticed that a tiny print found on the vehicle mode of Jazz featured scribbles that, when translated from the Cybertronian alphabet, read out "MAGA", which is an abbreviation for "Make America Great Again", the slogan of President Donald Trump. Hasbro soon released a statement that the issue had been investigated and that a vendor had placed the acronym without authorization. The company also clarified that they are addressing the issue with the vendor and that they "do not intend for [their] products to carry political messages, apologiz[ing] to anyone who was offended by this message".

Animated web series

Transformers: Power of the Primes is an animated web series developed by F.J. DeSanto, Adam Beechen and Jamie Iracleanos, and produced by Machinima, Inc. and Hasbro Studios, with the animation provided by Tatsunoko Production. It is the final installment of the Transformers: Prime Wars Trilogy series, being the direct sequel to Transformers: Titans Return. The series premiered on May 1, 2018 in the United States on go90, and on Tumblr internationally.

In the aftermath of the Titans' conflict that concluded with Optimus Prime's death, Megatron and the rest of the Transformers must stand together in order to stop Megatronus from wiping out their species forever. During their search for the Requiem Blaster, more mysteries about Cybertron's past will be uncovered, and a new Prime will be chosen.

Casting 
On January 9, 2018, it was announced that Mark Hamill, who had previously voiced Megatronus in Transformers: Titans Return, would resume his role for Transformers: Power of the Primes. It was also confirmed that Ron Perlman would voice Optimus Primal, after the character was voted by fans to become the next Prime, while Gregg Berger also reprised his role as Grimlock in addition to Volcanicus, the combined robot form of the five Dinobots. Other voice actors include Jaime King, Mikey Way, Peter Cullen, and Samoa Joe. Judd Nelson, Kari Wahlgren and Wil Wheaton also reprised their roles.

Voice cast 

The series features returning actors and newcomers as part of the cast.

 Gregg Berger as Grimlock and Volcanicus
 Peter Cullen as Optimus Prime
 Rob Dyke as Devastator
 Charlie Guzman as Menasor
 Mark Hamill as Megatronus / The Fallen
 Samoa Joe as Predaking
 Jaime King as Solus Prime
 Jason Marnocha as Megatron
 Judd Nelson as Hot Rod / Rodimus Cron / Rodimus Unicronus and Unicron
 Matthew Patrick as Computron and Swoop
 Ron Perlman as Optimus Primal / Optimal Optimus
 Patrick Seitz as Overlord
 Frank Todaro as Sludge and Starscream
 Abby Trott as Windblade
 Kari Wahlgren as Victorion
 Mikey Way as Snarl
 Wil Wheaton as Perceptor

Episodes

Comic book
According to John Barber, editor of IDW Publishing, the ongoing Transformers comics published by the company will not feature a crossover event based on Power of the Primes. IDW had previously published crossover events based on Combiner Wars and Titans Return.

References

External links
 

Transformers: Prime Wars Trilogy
2018 web series debuts
2018 web series endings
2010s American adult animated television series
American adult animated action television series
American adult animated web series
Anime-influenced Western animated television series
Transmedia storytelling